Magyarus is a monotypic genus of Vietnamese jumping spiders containing the single species, Magyarus typicus. It was first described by Marek Michał Żabka in 1985, and is only found in Vietnam.

The cephalothorax is brown, with darker shading around the eyes. The legs are grey-orange with brown spines; the first pair is orange-brown and lighter inside. The name is derived from the Hungarian word for Hungary, "Magyar".

References

External links
 Salticidae.org: Diagnostic drawings of the male palp

Endemic fauna of Vietnam
Monotypic Salticidae genera
Salticidae
Spiders of Asia